Legends Classic may refer to:
 NBA All-Star Legends Game, an NBA game from 1984 to 1993 that featured retired legendary players
 Legends Classic (basketball tournament), an NCAA basketball tournament in November of each year since 2007
 2015 WTA Finals – Legends Classic, a women's tennis exhibition event in Singapore